Tier 1 or Tier One may refer to:

 Tier 1 capital, the core measure of a bank's financial strength
 Tier 1 network, category of Internet backbone network
 Scaled Composites Tier One, a suborbital human spaceflight program
 Tier 1 nations in rugby union
 WTA Tier I tournaments, a series of elite women's tennis tournaments
 Tier 1 visas under the Points-based immigration system (United Kingdom)
 Tier 1 – UK Nuclear Site Management & Licensing, nuclear site management licensees
 Tier One (military), some highly secretive special forces units in the U.S.
 Tier 1 in the First COVID-19 tier regulations in England, the lowest concern
 Tier 1 in the Second COVID-19 tier regulations in England, the lowest concern
 Tier I, a data center standard
 Tier I, in United States vehicle emission standards
In a supply chain, those suppliers who sell to the manufacturer or main customer directly

See also
 Multitier architecture
 Two-tier healthcare
 Three-tier system (disambiguation)
 Tier 2 (disambiguation)
 Tier 3 (disambiguation)
 Tier 4 (disambiguation)